The New Zealand league system is the structure of leagues nationally and regionally, newly updated for the 2021 season. The system previously had a path from grassroots to the top flight but that stopped in 2004 with the New Zealand Football Championship being created as a replacement to the former New Zealand National Soccer League.

The current top flight of New Zealand Football is the National League, entering its inaugural season in 2021.

The top 4 Divisions of the Northern Region Football leagues for both men and women (Tiers 2–5) will be restructured for the 2023 season.

Cups 
The premier cup competition in New Zealand is the Chatham Cup which dates back to 1923.

Regional cup competitions are also run within federations, allowing multiple teams from the same club to enter.

Men's structure 

Clubs at the top of the pyramid are only permitted to enter a single team in their confederation's higher levels. Other teams from the same club are permitted to enter teams below this threshold, but have restrictions on promotion. Clevedon FC are currently the lowest ranked 1st team in the country, playing in NRF South Division 10 (Tier 15).

Notes

Women's structure 
Sources

References 

New Zealand Football Championship
New Zealand
Association football in New Zealand
Summer association football leagues
National championships in New Zealand